Antigua and Barbuda competed in the 2014 Commonwealth Games in Glasgow, Scotland from 23 July to 3 August 2014.

Aquatics

Swimming

Men

Women

Athletics

Men

Women

Track and road events

Field events

Boxing

Men

Cycling

Road
Men

Women

Track
Points Race

Pursuit

Scratch

Shooting

Full bore rifle
Open

Swimming

Men

Women

References

Nations at the 2014 Commonwealth Games
Antigua and Barbuda at the Commonwealth Games
2014 in Antigua and Barbuda sport